91st NBR Awards
Best Film: 
The Irishman

The 91st National Board of Review Awards, honoring the best in film for 2019, were announced on December 3, 2019.

Top 10 Films 
Films listed alphabetically except top, which is ranked as Best Film of the Year:

The Irishman
1917
Dolemite Is My Name
Ford v Ferrari
Jojo Rabbit
Knives Out
Marriage Story
Once Upon a Time in Hollywood
Richard Jewell
Uncut Gems
Waves

Top Foreign Films
Parasite
Atlantics
The Invisible Life of Eurídice Gusmão
Pain and Glory
Portrait of a Lady on Fire
Transit

Top Documentaries
Maiden
American Factory
Apollo 11
The Black Godfather
Rolling Thunder Revue: A Bob Dylan Story by Martin Scorsese
 Wrestle

Top Independent Films
The Farewell
Give Me Liberty
A Hidden Life
Judy
The Last Black Man in San Francisco
Midsommar
The Nightingale
The Peanut Butter Falcon
The Souvenir
Wild Rose

Winners
Best Film:
The Irishman

Best Director:
Quentin Tarantino, Once Upon a Time in Hollywood

Best Actor:
Adam Sandler, Uncut Gems

Best Actress:
Renée Zellweger, Judy

Best Supporting Actor:
Brad Pitt, Once Upon a Time in Hollywood

Best Supporting Actress:
Kathy Bates, Richard Jewell

Best Original Screenplay:
Ronald Bronstein, Josh and Benny Safdie, Uncut Gems

Best Adapted Screenplay:
Steve Zaillian, The Irishman

Best Animated Feature:
How to Train Your Dragon: The Hidden World

Breakthrough Performance:
Paul Walter Hauser, Richard Jewell

Best Directorial Debut:
Melina Matsoukas, Queen & Slim

Best Foreign Language Film:
Parasite

Best Documentary:
Maiden

Best Ensemble:
Knives Out

NBR Freedom of Expression:
For Sama
Just Mercy

Outstanding Achievement in Cinematography
 Roger Deakins, 1917

NBR Icon Award
 Martin Scorsese
 Robert De Niro
 Al Pacino

References

National Board of Review Awards
2019 film awards
2019 in American cinema